Catch Me Who Can was the fourth and last steam railway locomotive created by the inventor and mining engineer Richard Trevithick. It was an evolution of three earlier locomotives which had been built for Coalbrookdale, Penydarren ironworks and Wylam colliery. Demonstration runs began in July 1808, and Catch Me Who Can was the first locomotive in the world to haul fare-paying passengers.

Catch Me Who Can was constructed during 1808 by the engineers John Urpeth Rastrick and John Hazledine at their foundry in Bridgnorth, England. It was demonstrated to the public at Trevithick's "Steam Circus", a circular track in Bloomsbury, just south of the present-day Euston Square tube station, in London. Members of the public could pay to ride in carriages pulled by Catch Me Who Can around this track.

The circus closed following a derailment caused by one of the rails breaking underneath the locomotive. While the advantages and applications of steam locomotives had been demonstrated, the venture was a financial failure that played a significant part in Trevithick's bankruptcy in 1809.

History

Design and construction

During the late 1700s and early 1800s, the inventor and mining engineer Richard Trevithick was the primary developer of the steam locomotive. He wanted to present his new invention to the general public, and he looked for a suitable site to demonstrate his invention. He chose Bloomsbury, directly south of the Euston Road, near London's Euston Square. The site is believed to be under University College London’s Chadwick Building, which now houses the Centre for Transport Studies. A circular track  in diameter was built, on which a locomotive and a small number of carriages would run. Members of the public could view and ride on this train for a fare of 1 shilling. Trevithick hoped this would be a commercial venture, as well as creating publicity and hopefully demand for more locomotives.

Trevithick's fourth railway locomotive was built new for the Steam Circus. It was named Catch Me Who Can by the sister of Davies Gilbert. This new locomotive differed from the previous locomotive designs: instead of a horizontal cylinder, flywheel, and geared drive, Catch Me Who Can used a vertical cylinder encased in the boiler, driving one pair of wheels directly. The boiler was Trevithick's return-flue type, complete with an internal firebox. The locomotive was similar to an engine that Trevithick had built in 1803 to power a dredger for use on the Thames.

Operations
In spite of his goal of introducing steam locomotion to the public, Trevithick built a high wooden fence around the demonstration track, concealing it from view to all but those who paid to enter. This may have been done as a means of increasing revenue. Catch Me Who Can became the world’s first locomotive to haul fare-paying passengers.

Some claimed that performance of the locomotive was inferior to that of a horse over a 24 hour endurance test.

Operation of Catch Me Who was hindered by the soft ground that the track was laid on. Trial runs began around 24 July 1808, but almost immediately the ground under the track sank, causing the iron rails to break as the 8-ton locomotive passed over them. Trevithick had the track taken up and timber baulks laid under it to provide a more stable footing. By 28 July, almost all the track had been relaid and the train ran again soon afterwards.

Within two months of its original opening, the locomotive again derailed. By then, fewer people were paying the shilling fare. Trevithick had spent all of his savings on setting up the Steam Circus, and he could not pay to have the railway fixed, and it closed.

Impact
In the long term, the Steam Circus was not a fruitless venture. Trevithick had become the first person to successfully prove that a steam locomotive on iron rails was feasible. It would be another 20 years before Trevithick’s concept was fully realised at the Rainhill Trials of 1829, at which the pioneering railway engineers George Stephenson and Robert Stephenson successfully demonstrated the potential of their locomotive ’’Rocket’’.

Illustrations 

In 2008, the curator of the National Museum of Science and Industry, John Liffen, announced that the most widely-known depiction of Catch Me Who Can and the Bloomsbury demonstration track was likely a twentieth century forgery. Other depictions based on this influential work were in turn misleading. There are few reliable illustrations of the locomotive. Even before this, the lack of reliable information about Catch Me Who Can had long been acknowledged.

Replica
A replica is under construction by the Trevithick 200 charity at the Severn Valley Railway workshops, close to the site where the original locomotive was built. As of July 2017 work towards completion of the engine continues with the braking mechanism being the only major item left to complete. The replica engine can be seen outside near to the entrance of the Severn Valley Railway at Bridgnorth station.

See also
 History of rail transport in Great Britain to 1830

References

External links
 1808 - Trevithick's Catch Me Who Can (Incorrectly gives site as Torrington Square instead of UCL Chadwick Building)
 Catch-Me-Who-Can, 1808 (Incorrectly gives site as Euston Square instead of UCL Chadwick Building)
 Cruchley's Plan 1827 site of Trevithick's 1808 steam circus, now underneath the UCL Chadwick Building.
 Bowle's Plan 1806 an earlier plan of the area.
 Richard Trevithick : Cornwall's Pioneer of Steam (Incorrectly gives site as Euston Square instead of UCL Chadwick Building)
 www.steam-circus.info - Compilation of research on the exact location of the Steam Circus, with some new ideas
 

Early steam locomotives
Steam locomotives of Great Britain
English inventions
Individual locomotives of Great Britain
Richard Trevithick
Scrapped locomotives